Kirksey McCord Nix Jr.  (born 1943) is the former leader of the Dixie Mafia.

He was a suspect in the assassination attempt on Sheriff Buford Pusser and in the death of Buford's wife on August 12, 1967. Nix has repeatedly refused to comment about Pusser's claims that he was one of his wife's killers.

In 1972, Nix was convicted of murdering Frank Corso, a New Orleans grocery executive, in a break-in at Corso's home, and began serving a life sentence without parole.

Nix was later convicted for involvement in the 1987 murder-for-hire killing of Judge Vincent Sherry and city councilwoman Margaret Sherry, spouses, in Biloxi, Mississippi. As described by the United States Court of Appeals for the Fifth Circuit:

In 1991, a jury convicted Nix, Halat, Gillich, Sheri LaRa Sharpe, and John Ransom of wire fraud and conspiracy to commit wire fraud, and it found Nix and Gillich guilty of travel in aid of murder-for-hire. In 1994, Gillich became a state informant, and, in 1997, a second trial yielded convictions against Nix, Sharpe, Halat, and Leslie Holcomb; Nix was found guilty of racketeering, conspiracy to violate the racketeering statute, fraud, conspiracy to commit wire fraud, money laundering, and conspiracy to obstruct justice.

Nix is currently incarcerated at the Federal Correctional Institution, El Reno.

References 

1943 births
20th-century American criminals
Living people
American people convicted of murder
People convicted of murder by Louisiana
American prisoners sentenced to life imprisonment
Prisoners sentenced to life imprisonment by Louisiana
Prisoners and detainees of the United States federal government
American crime bosses
American gangsters